Previato is a surname. Notable people with the surname include:

Emma Previato (born 1952), American mathematician
Giancarlo Previato (born 1993), Brazilian footballer
Lúcia Mendonça Previato (born 1949), Brazilian biologist

Italian-language surnames